Bruce L. Rastetter is an American agribusinessman, agricultural entrepreneur, and former president of the Iowa Board of Regents, which governs the state's three public universities.

Early life and education
Rastetter was born near Iowa Falls, Iowa. He attended the University of Iowa, studying political science.

Career

Business 
In 1994, three years after the birth of his first company, he consolidated his feed management, construction, and swine projects into Heartland Pork Enterprises.  Rastetter created Hawkeye Energy Holdings in 2003, now one of the nation's largest pure-play ethanol producers.

Rastetter first became involved with the Iowa Board of Regents in 2011, becoming its president in 2013. His term expired in 2017. He serves on governing and advisory boards of a variety of organizations, including Cultivation Corridor, AltEnergy LLC, Rural American Fund, American Agriculture and Energy Council, Iowa Renewable Fuels Association, and the college of agriculture at Iowa State.

Politics

Rastetter is a well-known Republican donor, donating more than $1.5 million to state and federal political campaigns since 2003. In 2015 Rastetter announced the inaugural Iowa Agriculture Summit to address the political initiatives and interests of farmers and agriculture in the state, such as GMO's, nutrition labeling, food waste, and biotechnology. Mike Huckabee, Chris Christie, Donald Trump, Ted Cruz, Rick Santorum, Scott Walker, and Jeb Bush attended the event, located within the Iowa State Fairgrounds.

In January 2017, shortly before the White House transition, Rastetter voiced his opposition to pending mega-mergers in the agriculture industry, such as those concerning Bayer, Monsanto, Dow Chemical, ChemChina, and Syngenta. He stated, "Mergers like this have the potential to put into motion irreversible damage to agriculture."

See also
Harry Stine
Iowa Board of Regents
Dennis Keeney
Landgrabbing

References

External links
 Summit Agricultural Group official website
 Cultivation Corridor official website
 Iowa Ag Summit official website

Living people
University of Iowa people
American businesspeople
Year of birth missing (living people)